Angrisani is an Italian surname. Notable people with the surname include:

Al Angrisani (1949–2020), American businessman and writer
Carlo Angrisani ( 1760–?), Italian opera singer

Italian-language surnames